Sir James Henry Craig (or Sir James H. Craig) was launched in Quebec in 1811. She first appeared in Lloyd's Register (LR) in 1813 and then spent much of her career sailing between Britain and Canada. She was lost on 4 December 1829.

Fate 
By one report she was lost on 4 December 1829. She was last listed in 1831 with stale data.

Citations and references 
Citations

References
 

1811 ships
Ships built in Quebec
Age of Sail merchant ships of England
Maritime incidents in December 1829